, (born July 3 ), stylized lisa, is a Japanese singer-songwriter. She is known for her songs that were featured in several broadcast anime shows. She is signed under the Flying Dog label. Some of the anime shows include: Gosick, Psychic Detective Yakumo, Linebarrels of Iron, Melody of Oblivion, Mobile Suit Gundam SEED, Rental Magica, and Ristorante Paradiso.

Singles

References

External links 
 Official artist profile at Flying Dog 
  
 
 
 lisa at Oricon 
 Jangled Cat at Oricon 

Japanese women singer-songwriters
Japanese singer-songwriters
Living people
Musicians from Tochigi Prefecture
Anime musicians
1978 births
21st-century Japanese singers
21st-century Japanese women singers